The seventh season of Cheers, an American television sitcom, originally aired on NBC in the United States between October 27, 1988, and May 4, 1989. The show was created by director James Burrows and writers Glen and Les Charles under production team Charles Burrows Charles Productions, in association with Paramount Television.

Background
This season premiered on October 27, 1988, after a long period of reruns, indirectly led by the 1988 Writers Guild of America strike. At the time of the premiere, Night Court moved to Wednesdays, prompting the new series Dear John to fill in that spot. Besides Cheers and Dear John, other series in the Thursday night lineup for the 1988–89 season were The Cosby Show, A Different World, and L.A. Law.

Cast and characters
 Ted Danson as Sam Malone, a bartender and ex-baseball player. He still womanizes with every beautiful woman but fails to impress some, including classier women.
 Kirstie Alley as Rebecca Howe, a corporate bar owner and manager. After her former puppy love Evan Drake departed to Japan in the previous season, Rebecca fantasizes that her newest rich suitor will take over the Lillian Corporation. At other times, she often makes unsuccessful  attempts to impress her superiors in order to be promoted. Moreover, she completes duties (i.e. odd jobs) for her superiors, like organizing parties and pet sitting.
 Rhea Perlman as Carla Tortelli, a waitress and mother of eight children, including five from her first marriage. Carla is currently married to Eddie LeBec, who begins touring in ice shows outside Massachusetts, putting a strain on their marriage.
 John Ratzenberger as Cliff Clavin, a postal carrier and loquacious bar . He starts an  relationship with a trainee postal worker, Maggie O'Keefe.
 Woody Harrelson as Woody Boyd, a dim bartender. He starts dating Kelly Gaines (Jackie Swanson), the daughter of one of the heads of the Lillian Corporation, Mr. Gaines (Richard Doyle).
 Kelsey Grammer as Frasier Crane, a psychiatrist, now married to Lilith. They are expecting a child.
 George Wendt as Norm Peterson, a semi-employed accountant and painter. He also becomes a house decorator, especially for the Cranes.

Recurring characters
 Bebe Neuwirth as Lilith Sternin, a psychiatrist now married to Frasier. She becomes pregnant with Frasier's child.
 Jay Thomas as Eddie LeBec, a retired hockey player and husband of Carla. He currently works as an ice show performer, which puts a strain on their marriage. Thomas reprises the role of Eddie in two episodes this season.

Episodes

Specials

Production
Writers and producers David Angell, Peter Casey, and David Lee left the series in March 1989 for an upcoming production company, which became Grub Street Productions, which would later produce Wings and Frasier.

Reception
This season landed in fourth place with an average 22.5 rating and 35 share as of April 20, 1989. The Pittsburgh Post-Gazette described the character of Rebecca Howe as "annoying", and expressed pleasure at rumors that Joan Severance (originally set to play Susan Howe, a role eventually portrayed by Marcia Cross) could replace Kirstie Alley, contending that Shelley Long's departure in the fifth season was still affecting the series. Another syndicate columnist Joe Stein found the sixth and seventh seasons "good [yet] somewhat watered down", and found Rebecca not as "compelling" as her predecessor Diane. Conversely, Herb Caen of the San Francisco Chronicle praised this season, including the cast ensemble and their performances, but still missed departed characters Coach and Diane.

Todd Fuller of Sitcoms Online called this season "strong". David Johnson of DVD Verdict rated the story 90 percent and the acting 95 percent, praising its episodic approach and departure from story arcs, like Sam and Diane's relationship or Rebecca's failed attempts to win Evan Drake last season. He praised Alley as "a solid comic force" for her "over-the-top portrayal of neurosis". Jeffrey Robinson of DVD Talk gave this season three and a half stars out of five and gave a replay value of four, calling it "good" and its episodes "fun and amusing". Current Film called this season a "strong roll" with "fine performances".

Accolades
In the 41st Primetime Emmy Awards (1989), this season won three Emmys: Outstanding Comedy Series of 1988–1989, Outstanding Supporting Actor in a Comedy Series (Woody Harrelson), and Outstanding Supporting Actress in a Comedy Series (Rhea Perlman). In the 3rd Annual American Comedy Awards, Perlman was awarded as the Funniest Supporting Actress for her character Carla Tortelli.

DVD release

Notes

References

External links 
 Production order of Cheers (season 7) at Copyright Catalog
 Click "Set Search Limits", select "Range", select "Motion Pictures" at "Item Type", type "1988" at left box and "1989" at right box, either hit "Enter" or click "Set Search Limits"
 Then, after above step, search by title, type "Cheers", and hit "Enter" or click "Begin search"
 Cheers, season 7 at Internet Movie Database
 Cheers, season 7 at TV Guide

7
1988 American television seasons
1989 American television seasons